The women's tournament in sitting volleyball at the 2012 Summer Paralympics was held between 30 August and 8 September.

Results

Preliminary round

Group A

Group B

Final round

Semi-finals

Bronze medal match

Gold medal match

Classification round

5th–8th place semi-finals

7th–8th place match

5th–6th place match

Final ranking

See also
 Volleyball at the 2012 Summer Paralympics – Men's tournament

References

Volleyball at the 2012 Summer Paralympics